Pyinmana (population: 100,000 (2006 estimate)) is a logging town and sugarcane refinery center in the Naypyidaw Union Territory of Myanmar. The administrative capital of Myanmar was officially moved to a militarized greenfield site (which the leader, Than Shwe, dubbed Naypyidaw, or Royal City) two miles (3.2 km) west of Pyinmana on November 6, 2005. As of 2014, the city has an urban population of 72,010.

During World War II, Pyinmana was the base of the Burma Independence Army (later renamed and reorganized into the Burma Defence Army by the Japanese).

Climate

Notable residents
 Bo Let Ya Bo Htauk Htain Bo Tar Yar

See also
 Pyinmana Township

References

Populated places in Mandalay Region
Township capitals of Myanmar

de:Pyinmana Naypyidaw